The Tuanku Abdul Rahman Stadium (STAR; Malay: Stadium Tuanku Abdul Rahman), also known by its informal name Stadium Paroi and nickname The STAR of Paroi, is a multi-purpose stadium in Paroi, Negeri Sembilan, Malaysia. It is currently used mostly for football matches. Inaugurated in 1992, the stadium initially holds a capacity of 20,000 people. In 2004, the capacity of stadium had been upgraded to 45,000 people for the hosting of the 2004 Sukma Games. It is currently home of Negeri Sembilan Football association.
The stadium is named in honor of Tuanku Abdul Rahman ibni Almarhum Tuanku Muhammad, the eighth Yamtuan Besar of Seri Menanti, the second Yamtuan Besar of modern-day Negeri Sembilan and the first Yang di-Pertuan Agong of Malaysia.

See also 

 Sport in Malaysia

References

External links 
 https://web.archive.org/web/20140327083902/http://www.worldstadiums.com/asia/countries/malaysia.shtml
 

Football venues in Malaysia
Athletics (track and field) venues in Malaysia
Multi-purpose stadiums in Malaysia
Negeri Sembilan FA
Sports venues in Negeri Sembilan
1992 establishments in Malaysia